Fade Away is the sixth extended play (EP) by American indie rock duo Best Coast. It was released on October 22, 2013, on frontwoman Bethany Cosentino's label Jewel City. Produced by Wally Gagel, the EP was recorded at Wax Ltd's studios, and was inspired by musical acts like Mazzy Star, Patsy Cline, and My Bloody Valentine. Cosentino wrote the song "Fear of My Identity" about "having an existential crisis" after using the sedative Ambien.

Critical response

Fade Away received generally positive reviews from music critics. At Metacritic, which assigns a normalized rating out of 100 to reviews from mainstream publications, the EP received an average score of 67, based on 15 reviews.

Jon Dolan of Rolling Stone viewed Fade Away as a combination of the band's first two albums, describing it as "masterfully archetypal but utterly [Cosentino's] own." Alternative Press called the EP the band's "best work to date", remarking, "Lyrically introspective, musically tight and vocally resolute [...] Fade Away sounds like a reclamation record for Bethany Cosentino." Pitchfork deemed it a return to form for the band, noting that "[t]here are touches of sophistication across Fade Away that Best Coast haven't been able to achieve until now."

Accolades
Rolling Stone placed Fade Away at number 35 on their list of the 50 Best Albums of 2013, writing, "It's just seven songs but still felt like a breakthrough."

Track listing

Personnel
Credits adapted from the liner notes of Fade Away.

Best Coast
 Bethany Cosentino – vocals, guitars, keyboards
 Bobb Bruno – guitars, bass

Additional musicians
 Brady Miller – drums
 Ricky Cosentino – drums on "Who Have I Become?" and "Fear of My Identity"
 Wally Gagel – additional guitars, percussion, keyboards
 Brett Mielke – lap steel, 12-string electric guitar
 Xandy Barry – piano

Technical
 Wally Gagel – production, engineering, mixing
 Xandy Barry – additional engineering
 Pete Lyman – mastering

Artwork
 Bryan Collins – artwork

Charts

References

2013 EPs
Best Coast albums
Jangle pop EPs